Strunkovice may refer to:

 Strunkovice nad Blanicí, a market town in Prachatice District, South Bohemian Region, Czech Republic
 Strunkovice nad Volyňkou, a village in Strakonice District, South Bohemian Region, Czech Republic